Miguel Ángel Bravo Prado (born 29 November 1986) is an Ecuadorian football manager and former player who played as a midfielder. He is the current manager of Independiente Juniors.

Career
Born in Quito, Bravo is a product of LDU Quito's youth system, having played for their U-16, U-18, and U-20 teams. Unable to make it to the senior team, he transferred to ESPOLI in mid-2005, where he saw significant playing time in the senior team. In 2009, he signed with giants Emelec. At the club, he saw very limited playing time. He was subsequently loaned out to Quito-based club Universidad Católica for the rest of 2009 and helped the club gain promotion to the top-flight Serie A. In December 2010, he was re-signed by LDU Quito. Nowadays he is playing for the Deportivo Cuenca in Serie A.

References

External links
Bravo's FEF Player Card

1986 births
Living people
Footballers from Quito
Ecuadorian footballers
Association football midfielders
C.D. ESPOLI footballers
C.S. Emelec footballers
C.D. Universidad Católica del Ecuador footballers
C.D. Olmedo footballers
C.D. Cuenca footballers
C.D. El Nacional footballers
S.D. Quito footballers
C.D. Clan Juvenil footballers
Ecuadorian football managers